Frederick William Pooley (7 April 1852 – 11 September 1905) was an English first-class cricketer active 1876–78 who played for Surrey. The brother of Ted Pooley, he was born in Richmond-upon-Thames; died in West Ham.

References

1852 births
1905 deaths
English cricketers
Surrey cricketers
United South of England Eleven cricketers